Polly Redhead is a 1917 American silent comedy film directed by Jack Conway and starring Ella Hall, Gertrude Astor and Charles Hill Mailes.

Cast
 Ella Hall as Polly Redhead 
 Gertrude Astor as Lady Caroline 
 Charles Hill Mailes as Duke of Osterley 
 Gretchen Lederer as Lady Osterley 
 Helen Wright as Mrs. Brown 
 Louise Emmons as Mrs. Meekin 
 George Webb as John Ruffin 
 Dick La Reno as Gedge Tomkins 
 James McCandlas as Ronald 
 William Worthington Jr. as Edgar aka The Lump 
 Raymond Whitaker as Diego Perez

References

Bibliography
 James Robert Parish & Michael R. Pitts. Film directors: a guide to their American films. Scarecrow Press, 1974.

External links
 

1917 films
1917 comedy films
1910s English-language films
American silent feature films
Silent American comedy films
Films directed by Jack Conway
American black-and-white films
Universal Pictures films
1910s American films